Promethean may refer to:
Promethean: The Created, a role-playing game
Prometheans, a fictional faction in Halo, a computer game

See also
Promethean Theatre, Adelaide, a former theatre in Adelaide, South Australia
Promethean World, a global education company
Prometheism, a political project initiated by Poland's Józef Piłsudski
Prometheus (disambiguation)